The Golden Globe Award for Best Actress – Television Series Musical or Comedy is a Golden Globe Award presented annually by the Hollywood Foreign Press Association (HFPA). It is given in honor of an actress who has delivered an outstanding performance in a leading role on a musical or comedy television series for the calendar year.

It was first awarded at the 19th Golden Globe Awards on March 5, 1962, under the title Best TV Star – Female, grouping all genres of television series, to Pauline Fredericks. The nominees for the award announced annually starting in 1963. The award initially honored actresses in both comedy and drama genres until 1969, when the award was split into categories that honored comedic and dramatic performances separately. It was presented under the new title Best TV Actress – Musical or Comedy and in 1980 under its current title.

Since its inception, the award has been given to 43 actresses. Quinta Brunson is the current recipient of the award for her role as Janine Teagues on Abbott Elementary. Carol Burnett has won the most awards in this category with five wins and received the most nominations at 12.

Winners and nominees
Listed below are the winners of the award for each year, as well as the other nominees.

1960s

1970s

Best Actress – Television Series Musical or Comedy

1980s

1990s

2000s

2010s

2020s

Superlatives

Multiple winners

Multiple nominations

See also
 TCA Award for Individual Achievement in Comedy
 Critics' Choice Television Award for Best Actress in a Comedy Series
 Primetime Emmy Award for Outstanding Lead Actress in a Comedy Series
 Screen Actors Guild Award for Outstanding Performance by a Female Actor in a Comedy Series

References

Actress R Television Series Musical or Comedy
 
Television awards for Best Actress